The 1980 ARFU Asian Rugby Championship was the 7th edition  of the tournament, and was played in Taipei. The 8 teams were divided in two pool, with final between the winner of both of them. Japan won the tournament.

Tournament

Pool A

Pool B

Finals

Third Place Final

First Place Final

See also
 List of sporting events in Taiwan

References

1980
1980 rugby union tournaments for national teams
rugby union
International rugby union competitions hosted by Taiwan